Notocrypta paralysos, the banded demon or common banded demon, is a butterfly belonging to the family Hesperiidae found in Sri Lanka, India, Indo-China, Malay Peninsula, Sumatra,
Java, Lesser Sunda Islands, Borneo, Palawan, Philippines, Sulawesi Region, and Maluku.

Description

References

p
Butterflies of Asia
Butterflies of Singapore
Butterflies of Indochina
Taxa named by James Wood-Mason